Satyanarayan Asharamji Pawar is an Indian politician, social worker and former Member of Parliament of 8th Lok Sabha of Madhya Pradesh state of India.

Pawar belongs to Koli caste of Madhya Pradesh. in June 2022, he was appointed as head of Central Election Committee by Indian National Congress party.

References 

1947 births
Living people
Indian National Congress politicians from Madhya Pradesh